Rheem Manufacturing Company is an American privately held manufacturer that produces residential and commercial water heaters and boilers, as well as heating, ventilating and air conditioning (HVAC) equipment. The company also produces and sells products under the Ruud brand name. It is a subsidiary of Paloma Industries — . What became Rheem started in 1925 as a supplier of packaging to the petroleum industry, and is currently headquartered in Atlanta, Georgia in the United States. The company is one of the largest manufacturers of both water heating and HVAC equipment in the United States, and also produces and markets products in Argentina, Armenia, Australia, Bahrain, China, Chile, Brazil, Canada, Iraq, Kuwait, Mexico, New Zealand, Perú, Oman, Qatar, Saudi Arabia, Singapore, UAE, and Ukraine.

History

The company is named for its founders, brothers Richard "R. S." Rheem and Donald "D. L." Rheem. They were the sons of William S. Rheem (1862–1919), former Standard Oil Company of California president who led the construction of a major oil refinery for the company in Richmond, California. The brothers initially began manufacturing galvanized steel drums in 1925 as a co-partnership with Pacific Galvanizing Company in Emeryville, California. A third brother, William "W.K." Rheem, helped finance the company at its start. The Rheem Manufacturing Company was subsequently organized on January 22, 1930, buying out Pacific Galvanizing. Rheem also acquired the Republic Steel package company, which also had a plant in Richmond. Republic Steel made boilers and tanks, which allowed Rheem to enter the business of water heating. The company acquired the John Wood Manufacturing Company of California, which produced automatic gas storage water heaters, in 1931. The company expanded overseas to Australia in 1936, building a plant in Sydney. The Australian operation began making steel shipping containers, including drums, in 1937 and water heaters in 1939.

In 1941, the company became the largest manufacturer of automatic water heaters in the United States. During World War II, much of the company's efforts went towards wartime production, including building ships and aircraft parts. In 1954, Rheem brought the introduction of "glass-lining", which coated the interior of a water heater tank with porcelain to extend the life of the tank. One of the most significant events came in 1956 with the introduction of "Rheemaire" central air conditioning and heater systems for homes. This eventually became one of the company's primary business areas. In 1959, Rheem purchased the Ruud Manufacturing Company.

In 1968 a plant was opened in Bergum (Burgum in Frisian) in the Netherlands by (among others) Mr. P. Toonstra. The plant was successful but had to close its doors by the end of 1983.

Beginning in August 1970, Rheem began producing Heat pumps and HVAC units for residential applications, based in Fort Smith, Arkansas. In 1983, Rheem introduced the Richmond Water Heaters brand, aimed at hardware stores and home-improvement centers. In 1984, Rheem was acquired by Pace Industries, Inc. The company discontinued containers in 1985, ending 60 years making steel drums and other containers. In the same year, the company acquired Raypak, Inc., which expanded the business into swimming pool heaters as well as commercial boilers. In 1988 Rheem was acquired by Paloma Industries, Ltd., a privately held Japanese company with headquarters in Nagoya, Japan, which wished to expand globally.

Rheem was the first residential HVAC company to begin using scroll compressors throughout their lineup in 1994, and all air conditioners and heat pumps continue to use Copeland Scroll Compressors. The company was also first to introduce a 14 SEER remote condensing unit in 1997. In 1998, the company began supplying the Home Depot with a line of GE branded water heaters. In 2009, Rheem and Ruud were the first to sell a Hybrid Heat Pump Water Heater, which was more than twice as efficient as similar electric water heaters. Also in the same year, Rheem and Ruud central air conditioners were reported to have the fewest percentage of units requiring repair among all major HVAC brands according to Consumer Reports.

Rheem's market share of the central air conditioner market had been as high as 16% in the 1980s and dropped to about 11% by 2000. By 2008, a report by the United States Department of Energy ranked the firm as fifth in the US in the central air conditioner and heat pump market with a 12% market share (behind UTC/Carrier with 27%, both Goodman/Amana and American Standard/Trane with 14% and Lennox with 12%), while in the residential gas furnace market as of 2008, the company was also ranked fifth with a 12% market share (behind Carrier with 32%, Goodman with 15%, and both Lennox and Trane with 13%).

History of Ruud
Ruud was founded by Edwin Ruud (1854–1932), a Norwegian immigrant who lived in Pittsburgh, Pennsylvania. He developed the first automatic storage tank gas-fired water heater, which went into production in 1889. Ruud worked for George Westinghouse (1846–1914), but eventually bought the rights to produce the product he invented and formed his own company in 1897. In 1913, Ruud merged and absorbed the Humphrey Company of Kalamazoo, Michigan which also manufactured water heaters. The Humphrey Company had a large manufacturing operation in Kalamazoo, which Ruud continued to operate and expand. In 1954, Ruud moved all operations from Pittsburgh to Kalamazoo where they were headquartered until the purchase by Rheem in 1960.

Current products
In North America, Rheem and Ruud both manufacture and sell a full line of heating and cooling products for residential and commercial applications, including up to 98.7% annual fuel use efficiency gas furnaces, oil-fired furnaces, up to 20 SEER air conditioners, heat pumps, thermostats, air handlers, package units, and indoor air quality products such as media filters, UV lamps, and humidifiers. In many additional countries around the world, the companies sell numerous types of water heating equipment, including gas fired tank storage and tankless water heaters, high-efficiency condensing water heaters, hybrid heat pump water heaters, and solar water heaters under the Rheem, Ruud, Richmond, Paloma, Solahart, Splendid, and GE brands. Swimming pool-related products include gas-fired and heat pump heaters sold under the Rheem and Raypak brands. Protech replacement parts for HVAC systems are sold through the PROSTOCK retail program.

In December 2013, Rheem acquired Scottsboro, Alabama-based Heat Transfer Products Group (HTPG). HTPG, a standalone company, produces the Russell, Witt, ColdZone and Kramer commercial refrigeration brands.

In 2015, Rheem won the top spot in the Water Heaters category for its brand familiarity by the Builder magazine.

Former divisions
Rheem Califone manufactured audiovisual equipment under the Rheem, Califone, and Roberts brands. These were used in schools and institutions, and included public address systems, reel-to-reel audio tape recorders, phonographs, as well as Combo organs. Rheem and Ruud also sold re-branded Briggs & Stratton residential Emergency power systems beginning in 2007. As of March 2, 2013, the companies no longer listed backup generators on their Web sites.

Plant and office locations
All currently operating facilities are ISO 9001 certified.

Former facilities

NASCAR

Since 2007, Rheem has sponsored Richard Childress Racing (RCR) in the NASCAR Sprint Cup Series and Xfinity Series through their Rheem, RUUD, and Richmond Water Heaters brands. They previously sponsored Kevin Harvick and Harvick's racing team Kevin Harvick Incorporated (KHI), along with Ron Hornaday Jr., Cale Gale and other former RCR & KHI drivers in the Cup, Xfinity, and Camping World Truck Series. They formerly sponsored James Buescher in the Xfinity Series and Truck Series. Brandon Jones, the son of former Rheem CEO J.R. Jones, currently competes in the Xfinity Series.

In 2018 Rheem moved to Joe Gibbs Racing with Ryan Preece & Christopher Bell driving the Machine for 36 races. Rheem also was put on the rear quarter panel of the No. 18 Cup car driven by Kyle Busch as an assosicate sponsor to the No. 18. It was announced In September 2019 that Rheem would sponsor Christopher Bell for an unknown number of races in the No. 95 Leavine Family Racing Toyota Camry in the Cup Series in 2020.

References

External links
 
 Ruud Official Website
 Rheem family of brands
 Richmond Water Heaters Official Website - [http://www.rheem.com/about/brandsfamily a Rheem brand]
 Eemax Tankless Water Heaters Official Website - [http://www.rheem.com/about/brandsfamily a Rheem brand]
 EcoSmart Tankless Water Heaters Official Website - [http://www.rheem.com/about/brandsfamily a Rheem brand]
 Sure Comfort Official Website - [http://www.rheem.com/about/brandsfamily a Rheem brand]
 WeatherKing Official Website - [http://www.rheem.com/about/brandsfamily a Rheem brand]
 HTPG Official Website - [http://www.rheem.com/about/brandsfamily a Rheem brand]
 Raypak Official Website - [http://www.rheem.com/about/brandsfamily a Rheem brand]
 Rheem en Perú
 

Privately held companies based in Georgia (U.S. state)
Heating, ventilation, and air conditioning companies
Manufacturing companies established in 1925
Manufacturing companies based in Atlanta
1925 establishments in California